Kibler may refer to:

 Kibler, Arkansas, a city in Crawford County, Arkansas, United States
 Kibler Park, a suburb of Johannesburg, South Africa
 Kibler High School, a historic high school building located at the city of Tonawanda in Erie County, New York
 Kibler (surname)